"Don't Gotta Work It Out" is a song by American band Fitz and the Tantrums from their debut studio album Pickin' Up the Pieces.

Music video
The song's music video debuted on VH1 on September 20, 2011. The music video, which was directed by Charles Haine and produced by Chris Uettwiller via Dirty Robber, was shot at night on location in Bakersfield, California.

Charts

References

Fitz and The Tantrums songs
2010 songs
2011 singles